The 2016–17 Sam Houston State Bearkats men's basketball team represented Sam Houston State University during the 2016–17 NCAA Division I men's basketball season. The Bearkats, led by seventh-year head coach Jason Hooten, played their home games at the Bernard Johnson Coliseum in Huntsville, Texas as members of the Southland Conference. They finished the season 21–13, 10–8 in Southland play to finish in a tie for fifth place. They defeated Central Arkansas and Houston Baptist to advance to the semifinals of the Southland tournament where they lost to New Orleans. Despite having 21 wins, they did not participate in a postseason tournament.

Previous season
The Bearkats finished the 2015–16 season 18–16, 12–6 in Southland play to finish in a tie for third place. They defeated Nicholls State in the quarterfinals of the Southland tournament to advance to the semifinals where they lost to Texas A&M–Corpus Christi. They were invited to the CollegeInsider.com Tournament where they lost in the first round to Jackson State.

Roster

Schedule and results

|-
!colspan=9 style="background:#; color:#;"| Non-conference regular season

|-
!colspan=9 style="background:#;" |Southland Conference regular season

|-
!colspan=9 style="background:#;"| Southland tournament

See also
2016–17 Sam Houston State Bearkats women's basketball team

References

Sam Houston Bearkats men's basketball seasons
Sam Houston State
Sam Houston State Bearkats basketball
Sam Houston State Bearkats basketball